Skorokhodov (from скороход meaning a fast walker) is a Russian masculine surname, its feminine counterpart is Skorokhodova. It may refer to
Denis Skorokhodov (born 1981), Russian football player
Igor Skorokhodov (born 1986), Russian ice hockey forward
Sergey Skorokhodov, Russian opera singer (tenor)

Russian-language surnames